Julius Strauss is a wilderness guide, activist, journalist and writer.

Journalism career
Strauss began his career as a British print journalist who spent many years working in Bosnia, Kosovo, Afghanistan, Iraq and other war zones. In 2002, he was posted to Moscow as the Daily Telegraph's bureau chief, from where he covered Putin's Russia and various Chechen crises. He also continued to report from Iraq.

After reporting from the Beslan school siege in Russia in 2004, where more than 330 people died, including 186 children, Strauss took time out, suffering from PTSD.

In 2005, Strauss left the Telegraph and relocated to Canada, where he spent six months working for The Globe and Mail. In 2007, he was appointed to the Atwood Chair in the journalism department at the University of Alaska Anchorage.

Canada, Wild Bear Lodge, grizzly bear protection
From early 2006, Strauss ran Wild Bear Lodge in British Columbia.

He also still took on various freelance assignments. In 2011 Strauss served as a political officer working with the US Marines in southern Afghanistan for several months. In 2017 he returned to Russia, Ukraine and Georgia with Thomas Dworzak of Magnum Photos to retrace the 1947 steps of John Steinbeck and Robert Capa.

Between 2015 and 2017, Strauss spearheaded a political campaign to ban grizzly bear hunting in British Columbia as the Chairperson of the Political Committee of the Commercial Bear Viewing Association, which culminated in a full ban announced by the BC government in Dec 2017. He has been featured on The Grizzly Truth, Trophy and Ben Fogle's New Lives in the Wild.

Strauss continues to run Wild Bear Lodge taking a small number of guests out each year to view wild grizzly bears and other megafauna in their natural habitat. In the off-season he writes his own newsletter backtothefront.substack.com which includes dispatches, comment and analysis on Ukraine, Russia, Afghanistan, the Balkans and eastern Europe.

Personal life
Strauss second wife and partner, Kristin, unexpectedly died of cancer, aged 43, in 2/20.

References

External links
Grizzly Bear Ranch

Living people
British male journalists
Year of birth missing (living people)
Place of birth missing (living people)
University of Alaska Anchorage people